Sir Anthony Poyntz (1480? – 1533/1535) was an English diplomat and naval commander.

Life
He was knighted in 1513, when he commanded a ship in Thomas Howard's expedition against France. In September 1518 he was sent on an embassy to the French king, and was present at the Field of the Cloth of Gold in July 1520. In 1521 he was one of the jury at Bristol before whom Edward Stafford, 3rd Duke of Buckingham was indicted.

In 1522 he joined in the expedition to France of Thomas Howard, 2nd Duke of Norfolk in command of the Santa Maria. In the following year he became vice-admiral, and was employed in command of some twelve or fourteen sail in preventing the return of John Stewart, Duke of Albany to Scotland.

In 1507, 1522 and 1527 he served as High Sheriff of Gloucestershire, and in 1530 was on a commission to inquire into Thomas Wolsey's possessions.

Family
His parents were Sir Robert Poyntz, and Margaret Woodville, an illegitimate daughter of Anthony Woodville, 2nd Earl Rivers. In 1523 he was administrator for his father. He inherited Iron Acton, where his descendants were seated for many generations.

He married, first, Elizabeth Huddesfield, daughter of Sir William Huddesfield (d.1499), of Shillingford St George, Devon, Attorney-General to King Edward IV; and, secondly, Joan, widow of Sir Richard Guilford. His eldest son by Elizabeth was Sir Nicholas Poyntz, a prominent courtier who built Acton Court.

References

Notes

Attribution

1480 births
1533 deaths
16th-century English diplomats
15th-century English people
English knights
High Sheriffs of Gloucestershire